Yoğuntaş, historically Bereke, is a village in the Şahinbey District, Gaziantep Province, Turkey. The village is inhabited by Turkmens and had a population of 105 in 2022.

References

Villages in Şahinbey District